Tsing Yi Town is located on the eastern coast of Tsing Yi Island, Hong Kong and is part of the Tsuen Wan New Town.

See also
 Tsing Yi Hui

Tsing Yi
Populated coastal places in Hong Kong

zh:青衣島#青衣市